Mochtar is a given name, often used by Indonesians. Notable people named Mochtar include:

Ade Mochtar, an Indonesian footballer
Fandy Mochtar, an Indonesian footballer
Mochtar Apin, an Indonesian painter
Mochtar Lubis, an Indonesian writer
Mochtar Kusumaatmadja, an Indonesian politician
Mochtar Mohamad, an Indonesian politician
Mochtar Riady, an Indonesian businessman
Mohamad Mochtar, an Indonesian actor
Rd Mochtar, an Indonesian nobleman and actor